Iradan is a town in Batken Region in south-western Kyrgyzstan, on the border with Uzbekistan's Fergana Region. It is located at an altitude of close to 1,000 m and has a population of around 26,000 people.

References

External links 
A location map for Iradan

Populated places in Batken Region